A by-election was held for the New South Wales Legislative Assembly electorate of Condoublin on 4 November 1901 because the 1901 election for Condoublin was overturned by the Elections and Qualifications Committee due to irregularities in the poll. Patrick Clara had defeated Andrew Stewart by 15 votes however 30 people were prevented from voting at Bulgandramine.

Dates

Result

See also
Electoral results for the district of Condoublin
List of New South Wales state by-elections

Notes

References

1901 elections in Australia
New South Wales state by-elections
1900s in New South Wales